Titleholder (Japanese: タイトルホルダー, foaled 10 February 2018) is a Japanese Thoroughbred racehorse. He showed very promising form as a two-year-old in 2020 when he won his first start before finishing second in the Tokyo Sports Hai Nisai Stakes and fourth in the Hopeful Stakes. In the following spring he won the Yayoi Sho and ran second in the Satsuki Sho before returning in the autumn to record his biggest win in the Kikuka Sho. He improved again as a four-year-old when he added victories in the Nikkei Sho, Tenno Sho (Spring) and Takarazuka Kinen.

Background
Titleholder is a bay colt with a white stripe bred in Japan by the Okada Stud. As a foal in 2018 he was consigned to the Select Sale and was bought for ¥21,600,000 by Hiroshi Yamada. The colt was sent into training with Toru Kurita.

He was from the first crop of foals sired by Duramente, who won the Satsuki Sho and the Tokyo Yushun and was named Best Three-Year-Old Colt in Japan for 2015. Titleholder's British-bred dam Mowen showed modest racing ability in Japan, winning five races from twenty-two attempts. She was a great-granddaughter of Lora, who was the dam of On The House and the female-line ancestor of Golden Horn.

Racing career

2020: two-year-old season
Titleholder began his track career in a contest for previously unraced two-year-olds over 1800 metres on firm ground at Nakayama Racecourse on 4 October when he started the 1.3/1 favourite in a fourteen-runner field. Ridden by Keita Tosaki he led from the start and won by one and a quarter lengths from No Double Dip. On 23 November the colt was stepped up in class for the Grade 3 Tokyo Sports Hai Nisai Stakes over 1800 metres at Tokyo Racecourse. Starting a 15.6/1 outsider he settled in second place before moving up to dispute the lead in the straight but was overtaken by the favourite Danon The Kid and beaten one and a quarter lengths into second place. For his third and final run of the year Titleholder was stepped up in class and distance to contest the Grade 1 Hopeful Stakes over 2000 metres at Nakayama Racecourse on 26 December and went off at odds of 19.5/1. He raced in second place and briefly disputed the lead early in the straight but was outpaced in the closing stages and came home fourth behind Danon The Kid, Orthoclase and Yoho Lake."

In the official Japanese rankings Titleholder was rated the ninth-best two-year-old colt of 2020 in Japan, seven pounds behind Danon The Kid.

2021: three-year-old season
On 7 March at Nakayama, Titleholder began his second season in the Grade 2 Yayoi Sho (a major trial race for the Satsuki Sho) over 2000 metres and went off the 17.9/1 fourth choice in the betting behind Danon The Kid, Schnell Meister and One Day More. Ridden by Takeshi Yokoyama he led from the start and kept on well in the straight to win by one and a quarter lengths from Schnell Meister and Danon The Kid. Toru Kurita commented "It was a good win for him... he showed a lot of strength and some good footwork"

In the Satsuki Sho over the same course and distance on 18 April the colt started a 17/1 outsider in a sixteen-runner field. After racing in second place for most of the way he gained a narrow lead before gaining a slight advantage entering the straight and despite being overtaken by Efforia he "showed tremendous effort" to hold on for second place. When stepped up in distance for the Tokyo Yushun over 2400 metres at Tokyo on 30 May he tracked the leaders for most of the way before being outpaced in the closing stages and coming home sixth of the seventeen runners behind Shahryar, beaten three and a half lengths by the winner.

After the summer break Titleholder returned for the Grade 2 St Lite Kinen (a trial for the Kikuka Sho) over 2200 metres and started the 1.9/1 favourite. He was in contention until the straight but then faded badly and finished thirteenth of the fourteen runners in a race won by Asamano Itazura. In the Kikuka Sho over 3000 metres at Hanshin Racecourse on 24 October the colt started the 7/1 fourth choice in the betting behind Red Genesis (Kyoto Shimbun Hai), Stella Veloce (Kobe Shimbun Hai) and Orthoclase while the other fourteen contenders included Asamano Itazura, Victipharus (Spring Stakes) and Weiss Meteoe (Radio Nikkei Sho). Yokoyama rushed Titleholder to the front soon after the start a quickly opened up a clear advantage. Although his lead had diminished by the final turn, the colt drew away again in the straight and won by five lengths from Orthoclase. After the race Yokoyama said "We had a terrible race last time out so I was determined to win it this time and I’m glad it panned out... I concentrated in keeping him comfortable in a long race like this—he’s an honest horse, in a way too honest and always gives his full effort—so knowing that once in front he would settle, I let him go as he liked and didn’t try to hold him back too much. He has a lot to look forward to in the future but it would require a little skill as a rider to conserve his energy depending on the situations."

On his final run of the season Titleholder was matched against older horses in the Arima Kinen over 2500 metres at Nakayama. Ridden by Kazuo Yokoyama he started the 9.2/1 fourth choice in the betting, he raced in second place for most of the way before taking the lead in the straight but was overtaken in the last 100 metres and came home fifth behind Efforia.

2022: four-year-old season
Titleholder began his third campaign in the Grade 2 Nikkei Sho over 2500 metres at Nakayama on 26 March when he was ridden by Kazuo Yokoyama and started odds-on favourite against fifteen opponents. He led from the start and repelled several challengers in the straight to win by a neck from the six-year-old Boccherini Toru Kurita later commented "I thought the others were going to catch him in the stretch, but he reached down and found some more and held his ground. I was reminded again of just how strong he is."

On 1 May at Hanshin Titleholder contested the Spring edition of the Tenno Sho over 3200 metres and started the 3.9/1 second favourite behind the five-year-old Deep Bond (Prix Foy, Hanshin Daishoten). The other sixteen runners included Hayayakko (Leopard Stakes), Crescendo Love (Tanabata Sho), You Can Smile (Hanshin Daishoten), Divine Force (Stayers Stakes), Meiner Fanrong (Niigata Kinen) and T O Royal (Diamond Stakes). Kazuo Yokoyama sent Titleholder into the lead from the start and opened up a big advantage before restraining the colt approaching the final turn. He then accelerated away from his opponents and won by seven lengths from Deep Bond. Yokoyama commented "I felt that he was in good form when I rode him in the post parade so I just believed in him and concentrated on riding him in good rhythm. We were able to slow down the pace in the backstretch to conserve his stamina and I was not worried about the horses behind us in the last stretch... I think he will get stronger and stronger."

Titleholder was then dropped back in distance for the 2200 metre Takarazuka Kinen at the same track on 26 June. With Kazuo Yokoyama he went off the 3.2/1 second favourite behind Efforia in an eighteen-runner field which also included Daring Tact, Panthalassa (Dubai Turf), Stay Foolish (Dubai Gold Cup), Deep Bond, Hishi Iguazu (Nakayama Kinen), Meiner Fanrong, Potager (Osaka Hai), King of Koji (American Jockey Club Cup), Gibeon (Kinko Sho) and Win Marilyn (Sankei Sho All Comers). Titleholder started quickly and disputed the early lead before settling in second place behind Panthalassa. He moved up to gain the advantage entering the straight, opened up a clear advantage and kept on well in the closing stages to win by two lengths from Hishi Iguazu, with a further two lengths back to Daring Tact in third place. After the race Yokoyama said "I knew how the colt could run in good rhythm. The pace was fast but I wasn’t concerned because he still had enough power left at the straight. He’s still in the process of maturing and I think he’ll get better going forward,” while Kurita commented "I’ve been told by the owner that the colt will go to the Prix de l'Arc de Triomphe if he wins’ so we’re planning to send him straight to France."

Pedigree

References

2018 racehorse births
Racehorses bred in Japan
Racehorses trained in Japan
Thoroughbred family 9-c